Apostichopus parvimensis, commonly known as the warty sea cucumber, is a Pacific species of sea cucumber that can be found from the Baja California Peninsula, Mexico, to Monterey Bay, California, USA, although only scattered individuals were reported to occur north of Point Conception, California.

Physical description 
It has a soft, cylindrical body, with red-brown to yellowish leathery skin. There are numerous grey spots along its body, hence the name "warty." It has an endoskeleton just below the skin. The mouth and anus are on opposite sides of the body. The mouth is surrounded by ten retractable tentacles that are used to bring food in. Five rows of tube feet extend from the mouth to the anus.

Behavior and reproduction 
Apostichopus parvimensis is a solitary nocturnal animal.  When threatened, it can expel its internal organs through its anus and grow new ones. 

These sea cucumbers have separate sexes, and eggs are fertilized externally. Spawning usually takes place in November, and each female can produce thousands of eggs. After fertilization, a larva is formed which metamorphoses into a sea cucumber after a few weeks.

References

Stichopodidae
Animals described in 1913
Taxa named by Hubert Lyman Clark